Robert Vijay Gupta (born 1987) is a violinist, and advocate for social justice. He is a 2018 recipient of the MacArthur "Genius" Grant.

Early life 
(Robert) Vijay Gupta was born in 1987 and grew up in the mid-Hudson Valley of New York, near Poughkeepsie. His parents had immigrated from Bengal, India in the 1970s. At age 7 Gupta enrolled in the pre-college program at the Juilliard School and  age 11 he performed solo for the first time with the Israel Philharmonic Orchestra under the baton of Zubin Mehta. He toured internationally as a soloist and recitalist, performing across the United States, India, Europe and Japan. He enrolled in undergraduate studies at Mount Saint Mary College in New York at age 13, initiating coursework towards a degree in pre-medical biology. At 15, he started a 2nd undergraduate degree in violin performance at the Manhattan School of Music, studying under the then concertmaster of the New York Philharmonic, Glenn Dicterow. At 17 he earned a BA from Marist College, in biology.  Gupta held neurobiology research internships at CUNY Hunter College and the Harvard Institutes of Medicine, studying spinal cord regeneration and the biochemical pathways of Parkinson's Disease. At Harvard, Gupta met Gottfried Schlaug, a researcher and musician studying the impact of music on the brain of aphasic (stroke) patients. Gupta went on to earn an M.M. in 2007 in Violin Performance from the Yale School of Music, where he studied with Ani Kavafian. Shortly after graduating from Yale, Gupta won his first orchestral audition and joined the Los Angeles Philharmonic in 2007, when he was 19 years old.

Gupta became an advocate for the homeless of Los Angeles shortly after joining the LA Philharmonic. Gupta joined a group of LA Phil musicians close to Nathaniel Ayers a Juilliard-trained double-bassist whose mental illness left him homeless. Gupta met Ayers through Steve Lopez, the Los Angeles Times columnist who did a series on Ayers, which became a book and movie called "The Soloist."

In 2010 Gupta founded ”Street Symphony”, a non-profit organization providing musical engagement, dialogue and teaching artistry for homeless and incarcerated communities in Los Angeles. The organization performs at jails, prisons, shelters and transitional facilities and has presented over 1500 musical performances and workshops, spanning genres of music ranging from classical, choral, jazz, mariachi, reggae and West-African drumming. Every December, the group performs Handel's "Messiah," with musicians from skid row joining with professional musicians to perform. The organization's performances have been highlighted by the LA Times and The New Yorker magazine amongst the most prominent and notable performances in the country.

In a 2017 column for the New Yorker, music critic Alex Ross wrote of Gupta, “a visionary violinist...[and] one of the most radical thinkers in the unradical world of American classical music. With Street Symphony, he has created a formidable new model for how musical institutions should engage with the world around them.” Ross calls Gupta “a riveting speaker, at once jovial and intense. He talks rapidly, precisely, and with startling candor.” In 2012 Gupta presented a "TED Talk" entitled "Between Music and Medicine" which has received millions of views. He was featured in TIME 100 NEXT in 2019.

A riveting speaker, Vijay has shared his work with dozens of corporations, campuses, conferences and communities across America over the past 10 years, including The Richmond Forum, The Aspen Institute, Hallmark, Accenture, Mayo Clinic, US Psychiatric Congress, American Planning Association, and the League of American Orchestras, just to name a few. Vijay delivered the 33rd annual Nancy Hanks Lecture on Arts and Public Policy for Americans for the Arts and his 2010 TED Talk, “Music is Medicine, Music is Sanity”, has garnered millions of views.

A dynamic recording artist, Vijay recently released Breathe, an album of the piano chamber music of Reena Esmail, under his own label. His solo violin album When the Violin, a solo violin album featuring the music of Esmail, J. S. Bach, and Esa-Pekka Salonen was released under his own label on Bandcamp.

References 

1987 births
MacArthur Fellows
Living people
21st-century classical violinists
American classical violinists
Male classical violinists
American male violinists
American musicians of Indian descent
Marist College alumni
Yale University alumni
21st-century American male musicians
21st-century American violinists